Upland Island Wilderness is one of five designated wilderness areas managed by the U.S. Forest Service in East Texas. The  wilderness is located in Angelina and Jasper Counties and is part of Angelina National Forest. The area was named by conservationist Edward C. Fritz, who led the effort to designate wilderness areas in East Texas in 1984.

Ecosystems
The wilderness contains a diverse range of ecosystems, from park-like upland forests of longleaf pine and pitcher plant bogs with wild azaleas and orchids to bottomland hardwood forests and palmetto flats along the Neches River.

Maintenance 
The primitive landscape has been relatively untouched, and the Forest Service has managed to keep the area natural with the help of regulations and prohibited activities. It is their effort to keep the designated land clean and natural.

References

External links 

Angelina National Forest USDA Forest Service - National Forests & Grasslands in Texas

Wilderness areas of Texas
Protected areas of Angelina County, Texas
Protected areas established in 1984
1984 establishments in Texas